Vavaea is a genus of plants in the family Meliaceae.

Species include:
 Vavaea amicorum Benth.
 Vavaea bantamensis

External links

 
Meliaceae genera
Taxonomy articles created by Polbot